Hansen Nunatak is a prominent beehive-shaped nunatak,  high, near the terminus of Reeves Glacier, rising above the middle of the glacier about  northeast of Mount Larsen and 3 nautical miles northwest of Teall Nunatak, in Victoria Land, Antarctica. It is 6 nautical miles (11 km) east of Reed Nunataks. It was discovered by the British National Antarctic Expedition, 1901–04; the area was more fully explored by the British Antarctic Expedition, 1907–09, which named this feature.

References

Nunataks of Victoria Land
Scott Coast